Maria Skleraina (died 1045), often referred to as the Skleraina, was the political adviser, official mistress, and wife of the Byzantine Emperor Constantine IX Monomachos, controversially given the title of Sebastē.  

Of the prominent Skleros family, she was known for her charming appearance and character, and was married to Constantine IX prior to his succession to the throne, but the marriage was not considered legal by the church. Constantine became emperor in 1042 by his marriage to empress Zoë Porphyrogenita, who accepted his continued relationship with Maria Skleraina. Skleraina was not acknowledged as Constantine's wife but stayed at court officially as his mistress. 

She played an important role at court, acting as the political adviser of Constantine IX and benefitting the career of her brother Romanos Skleros. She was unpopular with the public. In March 1044, a riot broke out in Constantinople because the public feared that Constantine was planning to kill Zoe in order to marry Skleraina.

References

 Nicolas Oikonomidès: Byzantium from the Ninth Century to the Fourth Crusade: Studies, Texts, Monuments, Variorum, 1992
 Lynda Garland: Byzantine Empresses: Women and Power in Byzantium AD 527-1204, 1999

11th-century deaths
1045 deaths
11th-century Byzantine women
11th-century Byzantine people
Royal mistresses